Fosi is a Germanic tribe.

Fosi or FOSI may also refer to:

People 
 Polataivao Fosi Schmidt (1933–2005), boxer and Minister of Labor for Samoa
 Fosi Pala'amo (born 1976), New Zealand professional rugby player of Samoan descent

Other uses 
 FOSI, Forum Sedimentologiwan Indonesia, Indonesian sedimentologists' forum
 Formatting Output Specification Instance, a stylesheet language for SGML and XML
 Family Online Safety Institute, an international nonprofit organization
 Friends of Stradbroke Island an environmental lobby group on North Stradbroke Island in Queensland, Australia